The 2012–13 FC Porto season in Primeira Liga.

Competitions

Legend

Supertaça Cândido de Oliveira

Primeira Liga

League table

Matches

Taça de Portugal

Taça da Liga

Group stage

Knockout phase

UEFA Champions League

Group stage

Knockout phase

Round of 16

Overall record by competition

Squad

Current squad

Squad changes in 2012–13

Signings

Departures

Out on loan

See also
List of unbeaten football club seasons

References

Match reports

Other references

FC Porto seasons
Porto
Porto
Portuguese football championship-winning seasons